Kultainen kypärä ("the Golden Helmet") is an ice hockey award given to the best player in the Finnish Liiga. It is voted for by the players. It has been awarded since 1987.

In addition, a long running tradition by Veikkaus is for the current best scorer of a team to carry a golden helmet, also called kultainen kypärä or kultakypärä. The player that plays the most games carrying the golden helmet that also is in the top 20 of the league's scoreboard by the end of the regular season is awarded with €10,000 by Veikkaus.

Award winners
 1986-1987:  Pekka Järvelä (JYP)
 1987-1988:  Jarmo Myllys (Lukko)
 1988-1989:  Jukka Vilander (TPS)
 1989-1990:  Jukka Tammi (Ilves)
 1990-1991:  Teemu Selänne (Jokerit)
 1991-1992:  Mikko Mäkelä (TPS)
 1992-1993:  Juha Riihijärvi (JYP)
 1993-1994:  Esa Keskinen (TPS)
 1994-1995:  Saku Koivu (TPS)
 1995-1996:  Juha Riihijärvi (Lukko)
 1996-1997:  Kimmo Rintanen (TPS)
 1997-1998:  Raimo Helminen (Ilves)
 1998-1999:  Brian Rafalski (HIFK)
 1999-2000:  Kai Nurminen (TPS)
 2000-2001:  Kimmo Rintanen, TPS
 2001-2002:  Janne Ojanen (Tappara)
 2002-2003:  Antti Miettinen (HPK)
 2003-2004:  Timo Pärssinen (HIFK)
 2004-2005:  Tim Thomas, Jokerit
 2005-2006:  Tony Salmelainen (HIFK)
 2006-2007:  Cory Murphy (HIFK)
 2007-2008:  Ville Leino (Jokerit)
 2008-2009:  Juuso Riksman (Jokerit)
 2009-2010:  Jori Lehterä (Tappara)
 2010-2011:  Ville Peltonen (HIFK)
 2011-2012:  Tomáš Záborský (Ässät)
 2012-2013:  Ilari Filppula (Jokerit)
 2013-2014:  Michael Keränen (Ilves)
 2014-2015:  Kim Hirschovits (Blues)
 2015-2016:  Kristian Kuusela (Tappara)
 2016-2017:  Mika Pyörälä (Kärpät)
 2017-2018:  Julius Junttila (Kärpät)
 2018-2019:  Malte Strömwall (KooKoo)
 2019-2020:  Justin Danforth (Lukko)
 2020-2021:  Petri Kontiola (HPK) 
 2021-2022:  Anton Levtchi (Tappara)

References

Liiga trophies and awards